Sheila Dow is a post-Keynesian economist.   She was a Professor (and is an Emeritus Professor) of Economics at the University of Stirling in Scotland.  She has published in a wide range of areas, most notably in economic methodology, the endogeneity of money and the history of economic thought.

Selected publications 
 Dow, S. C. (1996). The methodology of macroeconomic thought.Edward Elgar
 Dow, S. C. (1996). Horizontalism: a critique. Cambridge Journal of Economics, 20(4), 497–508.
 Chick, V. and Dow, S.C. (1988) A post-Keynesian perspective on the relation between banking and regional development. In P. Arestis (ed.) Post-Keynesian Monetary Economics—New Approaches to Financial Modelling. Aldershot: Elgar, 219–250

References

1949 births
Post-Keynesian economists
Living people